Myrsine oliveri is a species of plant in the family Primulaceae. It is endemic to New Zealand.

References

External links
NZFlora online: Myrsine oliveri

Endemic flora of New Zealand
oliveri
Vulnerable plants
Taxonomy articles created by Polbot
Taxa named by Harry Allan
Plants described in 1961